Come tu mi vuoi may refer to:

 Come tu mi vuoi (film), a 2007 Italian comedy film
 Come tu mi vuoi (song), a 2004 song by Alexia
 , a 1930 play by Luigi Pirandello